Michael Grandage CBE (born 2 May 1962) is a British theatre director and producer. He is currently Artistic Director of the Michael Grandage Company. From 2002 to 2012 he was Artistic Director of the Donmar Warehouse in London  and from 2000 to 2005 he was Artistic Director of Sheffield Theatres.

Early years
Grandage was born in Yorkshire, England, and raised in Penzance, Cornwall, where his parents ran a family business. He was educated at the Humphry Davy Grammar School before training as an actor at the Royal Central School of Speech & Drama through 1984. He spent twelve years working as an actor for companies such as the Royal Exchange and the Royal Shakespeare Company and was also a member of National Youth Theatre before turning to directing. He made his directorial debut in 1996 with a production of Arthur Miller's The Last Yankee at the Mercury Theatre, Colchester. In 1998 he was invited by Sheffield Theatres to direct Twelfth Night, his first Shakespeare production. In the same year he made his London directorial debut at the Almeida Theatre with a production of Shaw's The Doctor's Dilemma.

Career

Sheffield Theatres
From 2000 to 2005 he was Artistic Director of Sheffield Theatres where his high-profile productions included Edward II with Joseph Fiennes, Richard III with Kenneth Branagh, Suddenly Last Summer with Diana Rigg and Victoria Hamilton, The Tempest with Derek Jacobi and Don Carlos with Derek Jacobi. He produced over forty plays with predominantly young directors and designers. He is credited with delivering consistently high quality work as well as bringing in new audiences and in 2001, Sheffield Theatres won the TMA Theatre of the Year.

Donmar Warehouse
From 2002 to 2012 he was Artistic Director of the Donmar Warehouse where he succeeded Sam Mendes. During his tenure, he expanded the theatre's repertoire to include European work, touring productions and an extensive education programme as well as taking the new Donmar brand to international audiences in America, Australia, Argentina and Europe.

In September 2008 he launched a one-year Donmar West End "access for all" season of four plays with affordable ticket prices when the company extended its repertory to the newly refurbished Wyndham's Theatre. Grandage directed all four productions: Kenneth Branagh in Ivanov, Derek Jacobi in Twelfth Night, Judi Dench in Madame de Sade and Jude Law in Hamlet.

In 2010 he launched a three-year West End season at the Trafalgar Studios to highlight the work of young directors who emerged from the Donmar's training scheme during his tenure.

During his decade at the Donmar he produced sixty six productions directing twenty five of them himself. His contributions to the Donmar included the purchase of the theatre site in Earlham Street, and the purchase of office and rehearsal space in nearby Dryden Street in 2011. These were made possible through commercial activity that Grandage engaged in on behalf of the Donmar during his tenure, particularly transferring productions to the West End and Broadway.

His work at the Donmar won Tony, Olivier, Evening Standard, Critics' Circle and South Bank Awards. He was first nominated for a Laurence Olivier Award in 2001 for Best Director for Peter Nichols' Passion Play at the Donmar Warehouse before winning in 2004 for David Greig's Caligula. Two of his musical productions for the Donmar have also won the Olivier Award for Outstanding Musical Production and a third won the Olivier Award for Best New Musical. He has won four Evening Standard Awards for his Donmar work including productions of Passion Play, Merrily We Roll Along, Grand Hotel, Ivanov, The Chalk Garden and Othello. In 2010, his production of Red by John Logan won six Tony Awards including Best Play and Best Director.

In June 2012, Constable & Robinson published A Decade At The Donmar by Michael Grandage, a photographic record of his tenure.

Opera
In 2010 Grandage started to work in opera, making his debut at Glyndebourne with a production of Billy Budd. This production has also played at the Brooklyn Academy of Music in New York City in 2014 and San Francisco Opera in 2019. He returned to Glyndebourne in 2012 to direct Le nozze di Figaro, a production that was revived for the following ten years. In the U.S. his work has included new productions of Madama Butterfly and Don Giovanni for the Metropolitan Opera, Chicago Lyric Opera and Houston Grand Opera.

Michael Grandage Company (MGC)
At the end of 2011, Grandage set up the Michael Grandage Company to produce work in theatre, film and TV.

In June 2012, alongside producer James Bierman, he announced a fifteen-month season of work at the Noël Coward Theatre in London's West End aimed at reaching out to a new generation of theatre-goers through pricing and access with over 100,000 seats going on sale at £10. 

Between December 2012 and February 2014 they produced Privates on Parade with Simon Russell Beale; John Logan's new play Peter and Alice with Judi Dench and Ben Whishaw; Daniel Radcliffe in The Cripple of Inishmaan by Martin McDonagh; and two plays by Shakespeare, A Midsummer Night's Dream with Sheridan Smith and David Walliams, followed by Henry V with Jude Law. Grandage directed all five productions and the season was nominated for six Olivier Awards. 

In 2014, The Cripple of Inishmaan transferred to Broadway where it was nominated for six Tony Awards.

In 2015, the company returned to the West End with Photograph 51, a new play by Anna Ziegler starring Nicole Kidman. The production continued their commitment to greater access with twenty five percent of every performance at ten pounds. Kidman went on to win the Evening Standard Best Actress Award as well as receiving an Olivier nomination for Best Actress.

Further theatre work in 2015/16 included a co-production with Emily Dobbs of Richard Greenberg's The Dazzle starring Andrew Scott and David Dawson, directed by Simon Evans at Found 111 and a co-production with Phil McIntyre of 30 Million Minutes, a one-woman show starring Dawn French, directed by Michael Grandage. This toured the UK and played in the West End twice before being broadcast on BBC Four.

In 2016, MGC produced Eugene O'Neill's Hughie on Broadway starring Forest Whitaker. Following this, Bierman left the company and producer Nick Frankfort joined alongside Executive Director Stella McCabe. In addition to producing work in all media, MGC now offers a General Management service as well as looking after a select group of creative practitioners.

In 2017, the company produced Labour of Love, a new play by James Graham in a co-production with Headlong. Directed by Jeremy Herrin and starring Martin Freeman and Tamsin Greig, this critically acclaimed production went on to win the 2017 Olivier Award for Best New Comedy.

In 2018, they continued their commitment to quality work at affordable prices in the West End presenting Red by John Logan and The Lieutenant of Inishmore by Martin McDonagh – both directed by Grandage. Also in 2018, MGC announced a new film in development based on David Pitts' book Jack and Lem: The Untold Story of an Extraordinary Friendship.

In 2021, MGC produced Ian McDiarmid in The Lemon Table - a short story by Julian Barnes adapted for the stage and presented in a tour of the UK by Wiltshire Creative, Malvern Theatres, Sheffield Theatres and HOME.

In 2022, MGC announced two new projects for the stage - Dawn French Is A Huge Twat which is a one-woman show starring Dawn French that is touring the UK from September and in the West End, Orlando from the novel by Virginia Woolf in a new adaptation by Neil Bartlett and starring Emma Corrin.

Film 
In 2016 MGC released their first feature film Genius, about the relationship between author Thomas Wolfe and his editor Max Perkins. The film, which was based on A.Scott Berg’s biography Max Perkins: Editor of Genius, had a screenplay by John Logan and was directed by Grandage. It starred Colin Firth, Jude Law, Nicole Kidman, Guy Pearce, Dominic West and Laura Linney and premiered at the Berlin Film Festival before a release on 16 June 2016 in the USA.

In 2022, MGC produced its second film, My Policeman for Amazon Studios alongside Berlanti/Schecter Films and Independent Film Company. This full length feature was written by Ron Nyswaner based on a book by Bethan Roberts and directed by Grandage. The cast includes Harry Styles, Emma Corrin, David Dawson, Gina McKee, Linus Roache and Rupert Everett. It receives its world premiere at the Toronto International Film Festival and is on general release on 21 October 2022.

Stage productions

Theatre (U.K.)
 1996: The Last Yankee – Mercury Theatre, Colchester
 1997: The Deep Blue Sea – Mercury Theatre, Colchester
 1998: The Doctor's Dilemma – Almeida and national tour
 1998: Twelfth Night – Sheffield
 1998: What The Butler Saw – Sheffield
 1999: The Jew of Malta – Almeida and national tour
 1999: Good – Donmar
 2000: The Country Wife – Sheffield
 2000: Passion Play – Donmar
 2000: As You Like It – Sheffield and Lyric Hammersmith
 2000: Merrily We Roll Along – Donmar
 2001: Don Juan – Sheffield
 2001: Privates on Parade – Donmar
 2001: Edward II – Sheffield
 2002: The Tempest – Sheffield and Old Vic Theatre, London
 2002: Richard III – Sheffield
 2002: The Vortex – Donmar
 2003: A Midsummer Night's Dream – Sheffield
 2003: Caligula – Donmar
 2003: After Miss Julie – Donmar
 2004: Don Carlos – Sheffield & Gielgud Theatre, London
 2004: Suddenly Last Summer – Sheffield and Noël Coward Theatre, London
 2004: Pirandello's Henry IV – Donmar
 2004: Grand Hotel – Donmar (after Vicky Baum's novel)
 2005: The Wild Duck – Donmar
 2005: Guys and Dolls – Piccadilly Theatre, London
 2006: The Cut – Donmar
 2006: Evita – Adelphi Theatre, London
 2006: Frost/Nixon – Donmar and Gielgud Theatre, London
 2006: Don Juan in Soho – Donmar
 2007: John Gabriel Borkman – Donmar
 2008: Twelfth Night – Donmar at Wyndham's
 2008: Ivanov – Donmar at Wyndham's
 2008: The Chalk Garden – Donmar
 2008: Othello – Donmar
 2009: Red – Donmar
 2009: Hamlet – Donmar at Wyndham's
 2009: Madame de Sade – Donmar at Wyndham's
 2010: King Lear – Donmar
 2010: Danton's Death – National Theatre
 2011: Richard II – Donmar
 2011: Luise Miller – Donmar
 2013: Henry V – Noël Coward Theatre
 2013: A Midsummer Night's Dream – Noël Coward Theatre
 2013: The Cripple of Inishmaan – Noël Coward Theatre
 2013: Peter and Alice – Noël Coward Theatre
 2013: Privates on Parade – Noël Coward Theatre
 2014: Dawn French: Thirty Million Minutes – UK Touring Production
 2015: Photograph 51 – Noël Coward Theatre
2018: Red – Wyndham's Theatre
2018: The Lieutenant of Inishmore – Noël Coward Theatre
2022: Frozen – Theatre Royal Drury Lane
2022-2023: Orlando – Garrick Theatre

Theatre (U.S.)
 2006: Frost/Nixon – Bernard B. Jacobs Theatre, New York
 2007: Frost/Nixon – National tour, U.S.
 2009: Hamlet – Broadhurst Theatre, New York
 2010: Red – John Golden Theatre, New York
 2011: King Lear – Brooklyn Academy of Music, New York
 2012: Evita – Marquis Theatre, New York
 2012: Red – Mark Taper Forum, Los Angeles
 2014: The Cripple of Inishmaan – Cort Theatre, New York
 2016: Hughie – Booth Theatre, New York
 2017: Frozen – Buell Theatre, Denver
 2018: Frozen – St. James Theatre, New York

Opera
 2010: Madama Butterfly – Houston Grand Opera
 2010: Billy Budd – Glyndebourne
 2011: Don Giovanni – Metropolitan Opera, New York
 2012: Le nozze di Figaro – Glyndebourne
 2014: Billy Budd – Brooklyn Academy of Music, New York

Charity 
In 2013, Grandage formed his charity MGCfutures, dedicated to supporting the work of young theatre makers and theatre audiences of the future. Initially, its educational work ran alongside the activities of MGC's work in the West End including the formation of a Youth Theatre. In 2014, when it acquired registered charity status, its reach became much wider. Since 2016 it has offered annual bursaries to young theatre makers including directors, producers, designers, writers, performers and all creative artists. In 2017 it piloted a new scheme giving young people the opportunity to watch and engage with theatre. The scheme, Theatergoers for Life, is designed to encourage young people to start a meaningful relationship with live performance by supporting and encouraging independent theatre-going to regional theatres. In 2021, the bursary scheme celebrated its first five years with a record number of 33 recipients receiving over £118,000 to help the industry back to work following the Covid pandemic. The charity's patrons include Dame Judi Dench, Dawn French, Nicole Kidman, Jude Law, Daniel Radcliffe, Sir Simon Russell Beale, Aidan Turner and David Walliams.

Honours and appointments

Grandage has been awarded honorary doctorates by the University of London, Sheffield University and Sheffield Hallam University. He has been given honorary fellowships by The Royal Central School of Speech and Drama, The Royal Welsh College of Music and Drama and Falmouth University. 

In 2005, he was awarded the German-British Forum Award in recognition of an outstanding contribution to German-British relations following his introduction of Schiller into the West End and regional repertoire. 

He was awarded the 2006 Award for Excellence in International Theatre by the International Theatre Institute. In 2010 he became President of The Royal Central School of Speech and Drama. He is also President of the Morrab Library and Patron of the Newlyn Arts Festival in Cornwall. 

In 2011, he was appointed Commander of the Order of the British Empire (CBE) in the Queen's birthday honours for Services to Drama.

Awards and nominations

Personal life
Michael Grandage has lived in London and Cornwall with his partner, the award-winning British Theatre designer Christopher Oram, since 1995. They entered a civil partnership in 2012.

References

External links

 
 
 

1962 births
Living people
Alumni of the Royal Central School of Speech and Drama
English theatre directors
British opera directors
LGBT theatre directors
People educated at Humphry Davy Grammar School for Boys
People from Penzance
English LGBT people
Drama Desk Award winners
Laurence Olivier Award winners
Tony Award winners
Commanders of the Order of the British Empire
National Youth Theatre members